The State Administration and Finance Workers' Union was a trade union representing civil servants and workers in the finance sector, in Yugoslavia.

The union was founded in 1978, when the Union of Administrative and Judicial Workers merged with the Union of Monetary and Financial Workers.  Like both its predecessors, it affiliated to the Confederation of Trade Unions of Yugoslavia.  By 1990, it had grown to 520,000 members and was led by Ram Bućaj.  That year, it split into various more localised unions, including the Croatian Administration and Judiciary Union, and the Independent Trade Union of Croatian Banks.

References

Finance sector trade unions
Civil service trade unions
Trade unions established in 1978
Trade unions disestablished in 1990
Trade unions in Yugoslavia